Husky Stadium (officially Alaska Airlines Field at Husky Stadium for sponsorship purposes) is an outdoor football stadium in the northwest United States, located on the campus of the University of Washington in Seattle, Washington. It has been home to the Washington Huskies of the Pac-12 Conference since 1920, hosting their football games.

Aside from football, the university holds its annual commencement at the stadium each June. It sits at the southeast corner of campus, between Montlake Boulevard Northeast and Union Bay, just north of the Montlake Cut. The stadium is served by the University of Washington Link light rail station, which provides rail service to downtown, Rainier Valley and Seattle–Tacoma International Airport. It is also accessible by several bus routes.

The stadium underwent a $280 million renovation that was completed in 2013. Its U-shaped design was specifically oriented (18.167° south of due east) to minimize glare from the early afternoon sun in the athletes' eyes. The stadium's open end overlooks Lake Washington and the Cascade Mountains, including Mount Rainier. Prior to the 2013 renovation, its total capacity of 72,500 made it the largest stadium in the Pacific Northwest and one of the largest college football stadiums.

History

The original stadium was built in 1920 by Puget Sound Bridge and Dredging Company with a seating capacity of 30,000. It replaced Denny Field, located at the north end of campus, south of NE 45th St. and 20th Ave NE.  Husky Stadium's first game was the concluding game of the 1920 season, a 28–7 loss to Dartmouth on November 27. On July 27, 1923, the stadium was the site of President Warren Harding's final public address; he died in San Francisco less than a week later.

The capacity of the lower bowl was expanded with the addition of 10,000 seats around the rim in 1936.
In 1943, 35,000 people watched a demonstration of a mock WWII bombing raid, showing how local forces would respond in an attack. The Seattle fire department and emergency response teams rescued mock victims and buildings constructed on the field that were exploded as P-38 planes flew overhead to demonstrate how citizens should react. The first of the stadium's iconic covered grandstands was constructed in 1950, adding 15,000 seats to the south side.  Several thousand additional seats were added in 1968. 

In 1987, 13,000 seats were added with the construction of the north grandstand. Similar to the south stand, this structure included a cantilevered steel roof covering a portion of the lower seats. The project made headlines on February 25, 1987, when the grandstand collapsed during construction as a result of miscommunication between the workers and the contractor, which led to the premature removal during the intended replacement of several support cables. Although there were no casualties, property damage ranged from $500,000 to $1 million and resulted in setbacks.

Husky Stadium was a primary venue for the 1990 Goodwill Games, where the crowd saw an address by former President Ronald Reagan, as well as an address by Arnold Schwarzenegger, and a performance by the Moody Blues & Gorky Park. The stadium hosted the opening and closing ceremonies, as well as the track & field competition.

Husky Stadium was the temporary home of the Seattle Seahawks for five games (two preseason and three regular season) in 1994 while the Kingdome was temporarily closed for repairs to its damaged roof. After the demolition of the Kingdome in March 2000, the Seahawks played at Husky Stadium for the 2000 and 2001 seasons before moving into Seahawks Stadium (now Lumen Field) in 2002.

The playing field at Husky Stadium was originally dirt, which was then replaced with natural grass in 1938. In 1968, Washington became one of the first major college teams to play on AstroTurf at home; at the time, the Houston Astrodome, Neyland Stadium in Knoxville, Tennessee, and Camp Randall Stadium in Madison, Wisconsin, were the only other major facilities with artificial turf. The AstroTurf field was replaced in 1972, 1977, 1987, and 1995. FieldTurf, a new variation of synthetic turf, was installed in 2000 at a cost of $1,074,958. The new turf features enhanced drainage and reduced abrasion through the use of synthetic fibers that are tufted into an infill of sand and rubber. The project was funded by Seattle Seahawks owner Paul Allen, who used Husky Stadium as a temporary home venue during the construction of CenturyLink Field. The first of its kind in the NFL, the surface was so popular with the players that the Seahawks, who had planned to use natural grass at their new stadium, instead installed their own FieldTurf surface. The FieldTurf at Husky Stadium was replaced with a newer one after nine seasons in 2009 at a cost of $350,000.

In addition to the new playing surface, the Seahawks made other improvements to Husky stadium in preparation for its tenure as an NFL venue for two seasons. A larger scoreboard debuted in 1998, with a  "HuskyTron" video screen.  Improved lighting for television, including corner lights, was added in 1999, and official NFL goalposts (optic yellow,  in height) were installed in 2000.

The Husky Stadium end zones were painted gold during the 1980s and early 1990s; the new AstroTurf in 1995 changed them to purple. They became natural green with the installation of FieldTurf in 2000, which lasted until 2009 when they reverted to gold for one season. Purple end zones returned prior to the 2010 season, and were temporarily painted black for the Huskies' first "blackout" game against UCLA on November 18.

On September 3, 2015, Alaska Airlines purchased naming rights to the field, which changed its official name to "Alaska Airlines Field at Husky Stadium." The agreement, worth $41 million over 10 years, became the largest of its kind in college athletics.

The Wave

Many claim that the first audience wave originated in Husky Stadium on Halloween 1981, at the prompting of Husky band trumpeter Dave Hunter, although it is documented to have begun at the Oakland Coliseum two weeks earlier during an MLB playoff game. Contrary to Hunter's account, former Washington yell leader Robb Weller has also claimed credit for the first wave. Weller was the guest yell-king during the Huskies' homecoming football game against Stanford. His initial concept for the wave was for it to travel vertically, from the bottom of the stands to the top, within the Husky student section. When the stunt was met with limited interest, he then decided to reverse the movement of the wave to travel from top to bottom. This failed miserably, as it was necessary to turn backward to see the wave progressing downward. Weller then gave up and returned his attention to the game. However, a fan named Omar Parker sitting on the open (east) end of the stadium at the student side started yelling "sideways". Weller did not hear him, but then many students tried to initiate a "sideways" wave on their own. After a few attempts, and more yelling of "sideways" by students, Weller took notice. He instructed the crowd to stand as he ran past. He moved along the track toward the open end of the stadium, explaining to the student crowd what he would do, then ran along the track toward the closed end of the stadium, in front of the student section. The stunt caught on after a couple of tries and continued around the entire stadium, and was then repeated throughout the rest of the game and the season. Longtime UW band director Bill Bissell also claimed co-creator credit with Weller, suggesting that the wave was devised by both of them prior to the game. The following week Bill Scott (known as "Bill the Beer Man") started the wave in Husky Stadium and also at the Seattle Seahawks game in the Kingdome.

Loudness

Husky Stadium has long been recognized as one of the loudest stadiums in the nation.  This is in part due to the stadium's design; almost 70% of the seats are located between the end zones, covered by cantilevered metal roofs that trap the sound.

On occasion, the high decibel levels at Husky games along with fans stomping their feet in the bleachers cause television cameras to shake. During the night game against #12 Nebraska on September 19, 1992, ESPN measured the noise level at over 130 decibels, well above the threshold of pain. The maximum recorded level of 133.6 decibels, according to ESPN, is the highest ever recorded at a college football stadium.

Tailgating

The north and south parking lots are packed with cars for tailgating. Husky Stadium is unusual in that fans can travel to football games by boat, known locally as "sailgating" (other stadiums with this feature include Neyland Stadium at Tennessee, Heinz Field at Pittsburgh, and McLane Stadium at Baylor). There can be upwards of 12,000 people out on Lake Washington next to Husky Stadium during game days. Before kickoff, the Washington crew team offers shuttles to anyone that wants to go to and from the boats and docks for the game.

Fans also gather at the Dempsey Indoor Facility just north of the stadium for Husky Huddles. After the game, the Tyee Sports Council and the University of Washington Athletic Department put on events where fans can gather and hear analysis of the game from Washington coaches and Husky Legends, and listen to the Husky Marching Band.

2011–2013 renovation

Husky Stadium had developed numerous structural problems over the years as a result of standing for nine decades in Seattle's moist weather, particularly in the lower bowl. In November 2011, Husky Stadium began a $261 million renovation, the largest single capital project in the university's history. Home games were played at CenturyLink Field during the 2012 season while construction took place. The Apple Cup in 2011 was moved to CenturyLink (Qwest Field through 2011) to advance the start of the project by several weeks.

The new Husky Stadium was developed by Wright Runstad & Company, designed by 360 Architecture, and constructed by Turner Construction company. The steel decking was supplied by Profile Steel. The new stadium is the first and primary income source of a completely remodeled athletic district which includes a new $19 million Husky Ballpark, a new track and field stadium, renovated soccer stadium, $50 million basketball operations and practice facility and recently completed projects such as the Husky Legends Center, the Conibear Shellhouse and Alaska Airlines Arena renovations, and the construction of the Dempsey Indoor facility. This major remodel of the athletic village coincided with construction for an underground station for a northern extension of the Link light rail system and a replacement of the Evergreen Point Floating Bridge.

The renovation project incorporated a new grand concourse, press box, video and audio system, and football offices, as well as new and improved amenities, concession stands, and bathrooms. The track that had enclosed the playing field was removed, and the field itself lowered by four feet to make room for additional seating closer to the sidelines. The student section was relocated from the north sideline to the west end zone, and the temporary bleachers in the east end zone were replaced with a permanent structure featuring field-level suites. The addition of box suites reduced the seating capacity from 72,500 to 70,138.  Despite the reduction in capacity, the renovated stadium is expected to be as loud as its predecessor. Additionally, new parking garages were constructed and facilities throughout the athletic village were renovated.

NFL exhibition games

Before the arrival of the Seattle Seahawks, Husky Stadium hosted 12 NFL preseason games between 1955 and 1975. The San Francisco 49ers played six times at the stadium, the most of any team. Other teams to make multiple appearances include the New York Giants, Los Angeles Rams, Cleveland Browns, and Chicago/St. Louis Cardinals.

At one point after the 1970 NFL season, Ralph Wilson came close to moving the Buffalo Bills from dilapidated War Memorial Stadium to Husky Stadium. The threat of relocation prompted the developers in the Buffalo suburbs to construct Rich Stadium in Orchard Park (later Ralph Wilson Stadium and now Highmark Stadium), which opened in 1973. The Bills have resided there ever since.

See also
 List of NCAA Division I FBS football stadiums

References

Further reading

External links

 

Alaska Air Group
Washington Huskies football venues
College football venues
American football venues in Washington (state)
Defunct athletics (track and field) venues in the United States
Defunct National Football League venues
Seattle Seahawks stadiums
Sports venues in Seattle
Sports venues completed in 1920
1920 establishments in Washington (state)
1990 Goodwill Games venues
University of Washington campus